Adam & Eve was a German schlager music duo who had several hit records in Germany in the 1960s and 1970s. There are two incarnations of the duo.

First incarnation
Eva Bartova (March 26, 1938, Bohemia - September 17, 1989, Chicago) emigrated to Germany in 1963, having studied classical ballet and voice in Czechoslovakia. She began recording with a group known as Eve Bartova & the Bartovs, where she met John Christian Dee (February 1944, Tonawanda - August 18, 2004, London), an American who had moved to England in the 1950s. He became "Adam No. 1" in the new duo, Adam & Eve. They signed a recording contract in 1964 and released their first single in 1966. After a string of singles, some of which charted, they separated around the end of 1968.

Second incarnation
Eve then joined the combo of Hartmut "Harry" Schairer (born February 23, 1946, Stuttgart), who became "Adam No. 2". They married in 1972 and became one of the best-known schlager duos in Germany. They divorced in 1982; Eve went on to marry singer Jimmy Harrison for a short time, but this marriage ended as well, and Eve then moved to America, where she died of cancer. Schairer went on to have a career as a composer and record producer; in 1998 he married the popular singer Gina Tielman, better known as Gina T.

Discography

Albums
Adam & Eve (1):
Paradise of Sounds (1967), Bellaphon

Adam & Eve (2):
Die schönsten Lieder- DLP (1973), EMI
Lieder aus Manuelas Taverne (1974), EMI-Hör Zu
Wir beide (1975), EMI

Singles
 "They Can Look at Us and Laugh" (1966) (with Adam No. 1)
 "Hey, Hey in Tampico" (1970)
 "Wenn die Sonne erwacht in den Bergen" (1971)
 "Ave Maria no morro" (1971)
 "Das macht die Liebe allein" (1972)
 "Dann kommt der Sonnenschein" (1973)
 "In Manuels Taverne" (1974)
 "Du gehst fort (tu t'en vas)" (1975)
 "Lena (Steig in den Sattel...)" (1975)
 "Lailola" (1977)
 "Ungarische Nächte" (1977)
 "Die versunkene Stadt" (1978)

References

German pop music groups
German musical duos
Schlager groups